Neutrik is a Liechtensteiner company that manufactures connectors used in audio and video recording studios and concert sound systems. Its product range includes XLR-type connectors, speakON connectors, powerCON connectors, etherCON connectors, patch bays, BNC connectors, and special connectors for industrial applications.

Neutrik was founded in 1975 by Bernhard Weingartner, a former AKG engineer. It has subsidiaries (collectively called the Neutrik Group) in the United States, Great Britain, Switzerland, France, Japan, China and Germany and distributors in more than 80 countries.  The corporate headquarters is located at Schaan in the Principality of Liechtenstein.

External links 
 Official site

Manufacturers of professional audio equipment
Brands of Liechtenstein
Technology companies of Liechtenstein
Electronics companies established in 1975
1975 establishments in Liechtenstein

ja:スピコン